"For the Love of Money" is a 1973 song by The O'Jays.

For the Love of Money may also refer to:
 For the Love of Money (film), a 2012 action crime drama film
 For the Love of Money (album), a 2014 album by Trackhead
 "Foe tha Love of $", a 1995 song by Bone Thugs-n-Harmony
 "For the Love of Money", a 2015 song by Dr. Dre from the album Compton
 For the Love of Money (2021 film), a romantic comedy film directed by Leslie Small

See also
 For Love or Money (disambiguation)
 Love and Money (disambiguation)
 Love of money